Miyoshiella is a genus of fungi in the family Chaetosphaeriaceae.

Species
As accepted by Species Fungorum;
 Miyoshiella fusispora 
 Miyoshiella triseptata 

Former species;
 Miyoshiella larvata  = Stanjehughesia larvata, Pleosporomycetidae
 Miyoshiella macrospora  = Chaetosphaeria macrospora, Chaetosphaeriaceae

References

External links

Sordariomycetes genera
Chaetosphaeriales